Babu Khan Tahir is a former Pakistani cricketer and umpire. He stood in one ODI game in 1984.

See also
 List of One Day International cricket umpires

References

Year of birth missing (living people)
Living people
Pakistani One Day International cricket umpires
Place of birth missing (living people)